Chiga may refer to:

 Chiga people, an ethnic group of Uganda and Rwanda
 Chiga language, their language

See also 
 Chigger (disambiguation)